Xerrox Vol. 2 is the sixth studio album by German electronic artist Alva Noto. On this record, the author turns to a list of contemporary musicians, including Michael Nyman, Stephen O'Malley, and Ryuichi Sakamoto. The record is the second part of his Xerrox quintet of albums.

Reception
Timothy Gabriele of Pop Matters wrote "If one could pinpoint the major fault with the latest collection by Carsten Nicolai, better known as Alva Noto to those with a good grasp of what constitutes provocative and exciting experimental music these days, it is that it lacks in surprises. For instance, while Xerrox Vol. 2 is more of a droning, monotonic affair than its predecessor (Xerrox Vol.1 ), with noisier tracks that bleed into one another rather than checker themselves like a decorated circuit breaker, the album’s invocation of stark, often gorgeous cinematic whole notes encompassed by neon spark-plug fuzz should not be the least bit shocking to anyone who owns the first (and slightly more essential) installation in this proposed series of 5 or for anyone who has had his or her ear to the powerlines since the days of Kid606's P.S. I Love You".

James Reeves of Residential Advisor stated "At the center of this white noise stands Carsten Nicolai, AKA Alva Noto, and co-founder of Raster-Noton. Thanks to the label's recent string of top-shelf releases, I'm back in their quiet corner. Xerrox Vol. 2 picks up where Vol. 1 left off, this time pushing samples from Michael Nyman, Stephen O'Malley and Ryuichi Sakamoto through Noto's Xerrox software...  If you believe in this sound, Xerrox Vol. 2 is an essential release, and if you simply need a soundtrack for a dead February day or pacing the floors at three in the morning, you can't do much better".

Track listing
 "Xerrox Phaser Acat 1" –12:11
 "Xerrox Rin" – 0:51
 "Xerrox Soma" – 7:11
 "Xerrox Meta Phaser" – 6:23
 "Xerrox Sora" – 6:54
 "Xerrox Monophaser 1" – 8:04
 "Xerrox Monophaser 2" – 5:31
 "Xerrox Teion" –2:03
 "Xerrox Teion Acat" – 5:26
 "Xerrox Tek Part 1" – 5:28
 "Xerrox Monophaser 3" – 6:14

Credits
Design – Carsten Nicolai
Sounds (all Xerrox software samples by) – Carsten Nicolai

References

External links

2009 albums
Alva Noto albums
Raster-Noton albums